Dominika Strumilo (born ) is a Belgian female volleyball player. She is part of the Belgium women's national volleyball team.

She competed at the 2016 FIVB Volleyball World Grand Prix, and 2017 FIVB Volleyball World Grand Prix. 
On the club level she plays for Dresdner SC.

She is of Polish descent. Her uncle Jerzy Strumiło was the coach of the Algeria women's national volleyball team.

Clubs

References

External links 
 Player profile FIVB
 Player profile, CEV
 Player profile Dresdener club

1996 births
Living people
Belgian women's volleyball players
Belgian people of Polish descent
Sportspeople from Sint-Niklaas
Wing spikers
Volleyball players at the 2015 European Games
European Games competitors for Belgium
21st-century Belgian women